Qualification for badminton at the 2020 Summer Paralympics begins on 1 January 2019 to 16 May 2021. There are 90 expected slots (46 male, 44 female) for the sport across fourteen medal events.

Timeline 
Eligible athletes have to gain points to qualify to compete at the Games. The list will be published on 20 May 2021. This table shows the timeline of championships where athletes have to earn points to be able to qualify.

Qualification
The qualification slots are allocated to the individual athlete or doubles pair, not to the NPC. The qualification ranking list is regulated by the BWF.
 An NPC can allocated a maximum of eleven male and ten female qualifications slots (total of 21). Exceptions are only granted via the Bipartite Commission Invitation method.
 An NPC can enter maximum of two athletes per singles event, except for the following listed events: 
 Men's singles SS6 can only have one allowed to participate.
 Women's singles SL4 can have a maximum of three female athletes if they are qualified via the Paralympic Doubles Ranking List allocation.
 Women's singles SU5 can have a maximum of three female athletes if two are qualified either via the Paralympic Doubles ranking list or Mixed Doubles quota allocation and one via the Singles ranking list allocation.
 Through Bipartite Commission Invitees
 An NPC can enter one doubles pair per doubles event via the Road to Tokyo Paralympic Doubles Ranking List.
 Selected athletes have to play in a minimum of three of the listed events in order to be ranked and to qualify for the Games.

Entries into singles event from doubles
 Both players from WH1 or WH1-WH2 pair that qualifies for the men's or women's doubles events will automatically gain entry into their respective singles events if they wish to do so. 
 All male SL3, SL4, SU5 players who qualify in the mixed doubles event will automatically be able to play in their respective singles events.
 All female SL4 and SU5 players who qualify in the mixed doubles event will automatically be able to play in their respective singles event unless their NPCs have already reached the maximum entry for the singles event.
 A minimum of one female player from an SL4 pair that qualifies in the Women's doubles SL3-SU5 event is allowed to play in their respective singles event. However, the decision is made by their NPC. All SU5 player who is also qualified for the women's doubles SL3-SU5 event will automatically gain entry into their respective singles event if they wish to do so. Any SL3 player who is also qualified for the women's doubles SL3-SU5 event or mixed doubles event can be entered into the women's singles SL4 according to BWF rules.

Entry requirements

Singles

Doubles

Slot allocations

Qualification summary

Qualified players 
Race to Tokyo Paralympic Singles Ranking List was published on 20 May 2021.

Singles

Doubles

See also 
Badminton at the 2020 Summer Olympics – Qualification

References 

Badminton at the 2020 Summer Paralympics